The Road Through the Dark is a 1918 American silent war drama film directed by Edmund Mortimer and starring Clara Kimball Young, Jack Holt and Elinor Fair. It was made as an anti-German propaganda piece during World War I.

Cast
 Clara Kimball Young as Gabrielle Jardee 
 Jack Holt as Duke Karl 
 Henry Woodward as John Morgan 
 Elinor Fair as Marie-Louise 
 Bobby Connelly as Georges 
 John Steppling as Antoine Jardee 
 Lillian Leighton as Louise Jardee 
 Edward Kimball as Father Alphonse 
 Elmo Lincoln as Pvt. Schultz 
 Eugenie Besserer as Aunt Julie

References

Bibliography
 Langman, Larry. American Film Cycles: The Silent Era. Greenwood Publishing, 1998.

External links
 

1918 films
1910s war drama films
American silent feature films
American war drama films
Films directed by Edmund Mortimer
American black-and-white films
Selznick Pictures films
American World War I films
Films set in France
1918 drama films
1910s English-language films
1910s American films
Silent American drama films
Silent war drama films